Oniscus asellus, the common woodlouse, is one of the largest and most common species of woodlouse in the British Isles and Western and Northern Europe, growing to lengths of 16 mm and widths of 6 mm.

Distribution
The common woodlouse is the most widespread species of woodlouse in the British Isles, both geographically and ecologically. It is not known from the Mediterranean Basin, but is widespread in Northern and Western Europe, as far east as Ukraine, as well as in the Azores and Madeira; it has also been widely introduced in the Americas.

Ecology
The common woodlouse occurs in a wide range of habitats, including some with little available calcium. It is chiefly found under stones, and on rotting wood. It is the only woodlouse regularly found on heather moors and blanket bogs, where it lives around items such as rotting fenceposts.

Description
It is relatively flat, and is a shiny brown/grey in colour, although juveniles are rougher.

Pale patches are often visible on the back of Oniscus asellus; these are areas that store calcium, which is then used to reinforce the exoskeleton after a moult. Moulting occurs in two halves, with the rear half moulting before the front half. The exuvia (the thing that is being moulted) is often consumed by the animal after moulting.

See also
 Crustacean
List of woodlice of the British Isles

References

Woodlice
Crustaceans described in 1758
Woodlice of Europe
Taxa named by Carl Linnaeus